En Garde Arts is a New York City-based theatre company, and a pioneer in the field of site-specific theatre.

Founded in 1985 by Artistic Director Anne Hamburger, the company was New York’s first exclusively site-specific theatre, leading audiences to unexpected locations across the city for innovative, contemporary, highly visual new work.  En Garde’s productions earned six Obie Awards, two Drama Desk Awards, the Special Outer Critics Circle Award and the Edwin Booth Award.  The company ceased operations in 1999 when Hamburger relocated to the West Coast; after returning to the East Coast, she re-formed En Garde in the fall of 2014. Since its relaunch, En Garde has produced several shows that have performed in New York and toured nationally and internationally, and has supported the development of new work through its Uncommon Voices series.

En Garde Arts in the 1980s and 1990s
From 1985-1999, Hamburger commissioned playwrights, directors and composers to create theatrical pieces for architectural sites and neighborhoods. The roster of En Garde’s alumni artists includes playwrights Charles L. Mee, Mac Wellman, María Irene Fornés; composers David Van Tieghem, Jonathan Larson; directors Michael Engler, Tina Landau, Anne Bogart, Reza Abdoh, Jim Simpson and Bill Rauch; and actors Carl Hancock Rux, Fiona Shaw, Fisher Stevens, Tyne Daly and Jefferson Mays. Intrepid audiences followed their work to a variety of locations, including Central Park, the Meatpacking District,  Penn Yards, East River Park, Pier 25, the Chelsea Hotel, the Victory Theater (New Victory Theatre, and the intersection of Wall and Broad Streets in Lower Manhattan.

In 1989, En Garde produced a series of three plays at the Dairy, Belvedere Castle and Bow Bridge (Central Park) in Central Park to great critical acclaim.  Obie Awards for Best New American Play and Best Director were given to Bad Penny playwright Mac Wellman and director Jim Simpson.  The New York Times wrote, “Moving environmentally through the streets and buildings of Manhattan, En Garde Arts is an invigorating urban presence.”  The following year, Wellman’s play Crowbar became the first legitimate theatrical production to be held in 42nd Street’s Victory Theatre for 60 years.  Designed and built for Oscar Hammerstein in 1900, the theatre’s elaborately decorated interior remained intact despite decades of neglect, including 20 years as porn theatre.  Crowbar was produced before 42nd Street’s redevelopment, and En Garde Arts could not find a cleaning company willing to take on the job, so a group of volunteers cleaned the interior to make way for Mac Wellman’s new play.  Directed by Richard Caliban with music by David Van Tieghem, Crowbar won Obie awards for En Garde Arts and actor Elżbieta Czyżewska, and was granted a special award by the Outer Critics Circle.

Now firmly in league with New York’s most influential and innovative theatre companies, En Garde continued to produce iconoclastic, critically acclaimed, award-winning work throughout the 1990s.  Reza Abdoh & Mira-Lani Oglesby’s spectacular, AIDS era cri de coeur, Father Was a Peculiar Man took place over 9 distinct locations through the Meatpacking District, long before its gentrification.     In an abandoned Victorian hospital on West 106th Street, Charles L. Mee’s Another Person Is a Foreign Country confronted the social marginalization of unconventional people; in fact, it was a celebration of difference, played like a beautiful human symphony under a blanket of stars. Director Anne Bogart’s cast included a blind choir with seeing-eye dogs, a group of emotionally disturbed rock musicians, and a man and woman, both 3’ tall, all staged against the Gothic, empty Towers Nursing Home (New York Cancer Hospital).  The evening ended with a stunning waterfall cascading down the building’s stone facade.

En Garde would win further Obie Awards for Tina Landau & Charles L. Mee’s  Orestes in the Penn Yards, and Trojan Women in East River Park Amphitheatre. Deborah Warner’s adaptation of The Wasteland with Fiona Shaw earned two Drama Desk Awards.  Hamburger used the New York Stock Exchange as a backdrop for JP Morgan Saves the Nation by composer Jonathan Larson.  On opening night, he slipped her a cassette tape of the work he was just developing; it would become the musical phenomenon RENT. Hamburger was recognized with the Edwin Booth and Lee Reynolds Awards for the impressive body of her work.  In 1999, she was offered and accepted the post of artistic director with the La Jolla Playhouse.  Within six months of moving to California, she received an offer to establish a new creative division for the Walt Disney Company, where she remained until returning to New York.

Re-launch (2014 – present)

Basetrack Live 

Hamburger re-launched En Garde Arts in 2014 with Basetrack Live, a multimedia fusion of music, film, photojournalism and performance, that explores the impact of war on veterans and their families. The show was developed in collaboration with the corpsmen and families of the 1st Battalion 8th Marines and inspired by the website One-Eight Basetrack (a citizen journalism project featuring the work of Teru Kuwayama, Balazs Gardi and Tivadar Domaniczky). The production premiered in Austin, TX in September 2014, and toured to over 40 cities nationally with a New York premiere at the Brooklyn Academy of Music on Veterans Day of 2014. 
Basetrack Live was invited to Fort Hood Military Base in Killeen, TX at the invitation of the Commanding General to encourage active-duty soldiers to avail themselves of mental health services. The production served as a resiliency program to prepare soon to deploy soldiers, highlight existing challenges and raise awareness of Psychological Health and Traumatic Brain Injury warning signs for senior leaders and their soldiers. In talk back sessions held after each performance, the producer, actors, and medical treatment facility treatment subject matter experts answered audience questions, discussed global treatment approaches, and described available services for treatment. Six months of research (three pre- and three post-performance) by the Intrepid Behavioral Health Center on base determined a 36% reduction in stigma surrounding seeking services for mental health issues such as post-traumatic stress disorder. Basetrack was also named Best Theatre of 2014 in The New York Times. 

BOSSS (Big Outdoor Site Specific Stuff)

En Garde Arts continued to grow, creating the highly anticipated Emerging Arts Festival BOSSS (Big Outdoor Site Specific Stuff) in the fall of 2015. Beginning in early 2015, Hamburger gathered multiple artists together once a week to brainstorm ideas. Hamburger mentored the artists as pieces began to take shape, working with the Hudson River Park as a performance space. 
Completely free to the public, BOSSS programming included Given The Present, The Future Does Not Depend On The Past (written by Sam Alper, composed and lyricized by Deepali Gupta, and directed by Jimmy Maize), The Visitors (written and directed by Barbara Cassidy and choreographed by Johari Mayfield, with Jessica Corbin as Choral Leader), Moms (written by Sarah Delappe [playwright of The Wolves] and directed by Morgan Green), The Queer Garden (written by Kenny Finkle, directed by Jessie Geiger, and produced by Louise English), We Were Wild Once Episode 6: Talks With A Drunk (directed by Sanaz Ghajarrahimi), Night, Janitor, Carousel (directed by Ellie Heyman), An Evening With Bina48 (directed by Andrew Scoville, designed by David Tennant and Kate Freer), This Place (directed by Lee Sunday Evans), Gnomads of the Garden (written by Stephanie Okun), Long Time (conceived by PopUP Theatrics, written by Peca Ștefan, and directed by Tamilla Woodard), and Ghost Card (choreographed by Megan Weaver and Hassan Christopher). 

Wilderness

In 2016, En Garde Arts premiered Wilderness at the Abrons Arts Center in New York, NY. This multimedia documentary theatre piece speaks to the search for connection between parents and children in families amongst the complexities that accompany life in the 21st century, including mental health, addiction, and gender and sexual identity. Inspired by co-writer and executive producer Anne Hamburger’s own experiences with her son, this piece compiled real-life interviews, research, and the blending of documentary and fiction to portray the complex journey that parents and children embark in seeking therapy and communication. Wilderness toured across the country, was published by Dramatists Play Service and is now being licensed by colleges and universities around the world. In 2014, Wilderness was named Critics’ Pick in The New York Times, which called it a "terrific, moving new multimedia theater piece."

Red Hills

In 2018, En Garde premiered Red Hills (written by Asiimwe Deborah Kawe and Sean Christopher Lewis, directed by Katie Pearl) in New York, NY.  Red Hills was a site-specific piece exploring the questions of “Who has the right to tell a story?” and “Whose story is it?” through the lens of the genocide against the Tutsi in Rwanda. Red Hills tells the story of an American missionary named David and a Rwandan tour guide named God’s Blessing who meet as teenagers during the Genocide. Back in the U.S., David writes a book called Dogs of Rwanda that becomes famous but is riddled with lies and omissions. When God’s Blessing happens upon the book 20 years later, this propels David to return to Rwanda, reconnect with God’s Blessing to relive the past and learn the meaning of forgiveness. The production took over a 20,000 square foot empty and raw floor of a downtown office building located at 101 Greenwich Street, transforming it into multiple sites, including an NGO-headquarters, the Kigali airport, Nyamata Genocide Memorial and the red hills of Rwanda.  One of the most meaningful responses to the production came from a Genocide survivor who was so moved by the show that she asked if she could bring in a photograph of her own family to add to the altar of remembrance in the set.

En Garde Arts’ Community Engagement Coordinator Heather Cohn, along with Red Hills Community Engagement Facilitator Channie Waites, crafted post-show panel discussions with experts on Rwanda and healing trauma. On June 20, 2018, audiences were treated to a Rwandan dinner prior to a benefit performance and encouraged to talk about their reactions to the play, their thoughts on what stories need to be heard & who should tell them, what communities, groups, and/or perspectives they least understood, and whose stories they wished to open themselves to hearing.

Uncommon Voices

Uncommon Voices is an intergenerational series for art, activism, conversation and community, which occurred  on the first Monday of each month at The Commons Cafe in Brooklyn. Since launching in January 2019, the series has featured dozens of playwrights, directors and performers whose work is at the intersection of art and social justice. Artists that have been featured in Uncommon Voices are grappling with subject matter that has ranged from the issues of teaching teens at Rikers; misogyny and #MeToo; the climate crisis; and xenophobia. Some of the playwrights and performing artists featured in the Uncommon Voices series include Tonya Pinkins, Andre De Shields, Miranda Rose Hall, Nadine Malouf, Pascale Armand, Kevin R. Free,  Danny Pudi, and Syndee Winters, among others

ALL ARTS:
Beginning in early 2020, En Garden’s Uncommon Voices series was featured on WNET’s All Arts program in collaboration with Emmy Award-winning producer Jesse Green. Over the course of 2020, the series received over 230,000 views across all streaming platforms.

Uncommon Voices, Unexpected Places:
Due to the COVID-19 pandemic suspending all indoor performances, En Garde Arts created an outdoor alternative: Uncommon Voices: Unexpected Places. This program is a site-specific continuation of the Uncommon Voices program, with En Garde returning to its roots and using the city as its stage. The first performance of Uncommon Voices: Unexpected Places featured renowned writer and performer David Greenspan in collaboration with Jamie Lawrence in Wartime Canteen for a New Era, which saw Greenspan and Lawrence performing on the stoop of a brownstone in Brooklyn in October 2020. 

Fandango for Butterflies (And Coyotes)

Inspired by interviews with undocumented immigrants from Latin America living in New York, Fandango for Butterflies (And Coyotes) takes the form of a fandango—a community celebration where stories are brought to life through live performance, music, and dance. Written by Andrea Thome, with direction by José Zayas and original music by Sinuhé Padilla, Fandango premiered at La MaMa in February 2020, and was a New York Times Critics Pick. The Times called it a "sensitive portrait of the in-between: characters balancing the small joys of everyday life with the fear of uncertainty."

On the eve of city-wide ICE raids, a group of immigrants gather in an undisclosed community center in NYC for a fandango. As fear encroaches — fear for family left behind in their home countries, fear for loved ones in the middle of their dangerous journey to New York, fear of leaving the sanctuary of the community center simply just to get a bag of ice — a sense of camaraderie builds between the participants. Strangers become friends, friends become family, and the fandango plays on.

Performances were in English and Spanish with supertitles, making the show fully accessible to Spanish and English-speaking audiences. After its initial run, En Garde partnered with the NYC Mayor’s Office of Immigrant Affairs for its five-borough tour around New York, who had a booth at select performances which provided both immigrants and allies with resources and actionable steps. The tour was forced to close on March 13, 2020 due to the COVID-19 pandemic.

Production history

1985: 	The Ritual Project (Central Park) This collaboration included writer, Nancy Beckett and composer, Kim Sherman and sculptor, Michael Berkowicz. Directed by Michael Engler, performed by Kate Fugeli as the Girl, and sung by three opera singers

1986:	Terminal Bar  (abandoned car showroom, SoHo) written by Paul Selig, directed by Michael Engler, starring Fisher Stevens

1987:  Naked Chambers (intersection of Greenwich & Chambers Streets, TriBeCa) written by Dick Beebe, starring Richard Gottlieb

1988: 3 Pieces for a Warehouse (warehouse, Lower Westside) by
	María Irene Fornés, Anna Cassio and Quincy Long

1989:  At the Chelsea (Hotel Chelsea) including A Quiet Evening with Sid and Nancy starring Penny Arcade (performer) and Steven Wastell; The Room with David Van Tieghem and Tina Dudek; Embedded by Ann Carlson; Letters From Dead People by Frank Maya; and John Kelly performing as Joni Mitchell

1989: Plays in the Park (Central Park), including Bad Penny written by Mac Wellman and directed by Jim Simpson 

1989: Krapp's Last Tape (1 Main Street, Brooklyn Waterfront) starring and directed by Paul Zimet of The Talking Band

1990: Crowbar (Victory Theater, 42nd St) written by Mac Wellman, directed by Richard Caliban, with music by David Van Tieghem

1990: Father Was a Peculiar Man (Meatpacking District) directed by Reza Abdoh, co-written by Reza Abdoh & Mira-Lani Oglesby

1991: Another Person Is a Foreign Country (Towers Nursing Home, 455 Central Park West) written by Charles L. Mee, Jr., directed by Anne Bogart

1991: Occasional Grace (Universalist Church at Central Park West & 76th St) directed by Bill Rauch

1992: Vanquished by Voodoo (façade of the Dwyer Warehouse, Harlem) written and directed by Laurie Carlos, featuring Carl Hancock Rux and Viola Sheely

1993: Strange Feet (Natural History Museum of the Smithsonian Institution)  written by Mac Wellman, directed by Jim Simpson, music by David Van Tieghem

1993: Orestes (Penn Yards) adapted by Charles L. Mee, Jr., directed by Tina Landau, starring Jefferson Mays and Theresa McCarthy

1994: Marathon Dancing (Grand Ballroom, Masonic Grand Lodge at 71 West 23rd St.) written by Laura Harrington, directed by Anne Bogart, music by Christopher Drobny, choreography by Alison Shafer

1994: Stonewall: Night Variations (Pier 25 on the Hudson River) directed by Tina Landau

1995: J.P. Morgan Saves the Nation (outside Federal Hall National Memorial at the intersection of Wall and Broad Streets, Lower Manhattan) book and lyrics by Jeffrey M. Jones, music by Jonathan Larson, directed by Jean Randich, choreography by Doug Elkins

1996: The Trojan Women: A Love Story (East River Park Amphitheater) written by Charles L. Mee, Jr., directed by Tina Landau, starring Sharon Scruggs

1996: The Waste Land (Liberty Theatre (New York, New York), 42nd St.) directed by Deborah Warner, starring Fiona Shaw

1997: Sweet Thereisenstradt (Archa Theater, Prague), based on the diary of Willi Mahler, directed by Damien Gray

1998:  Mystery School (Angel Orensanz Foundation Center for the Arts, 172 Norfolk St., SoHo) written by Paul Selig, directed by Doug Hughes, music and sound design by David Van Tieghem, starring Tyne Daly

1998: Secret History of the Lower East Side (roof of the Seward Park High School, 350 Grand St, Lower East Side) written by Carlos Murillo, Alice Tuan and Peter Ullian, directed by Matthew Wilder

2014: Basetrack Live (Brooklyn Academy of Music), created by Edward Bilous, co-adapted by Jason Grote & Seth Bockley & Anne Hamburger, Directed by Seth Bockley, Music Composed by Michelle DiBucci, Edward Bilous and Greg Kalember. (Inspired by the website One-Eight Basetrack, a citizen journalism project featuring the work of Teru Kuwayama, Balazs Gardi and Tivadar Domaniczky)

2016: Wilderness (Abrons Arts Center), Written by Seth Bockley & Anne Hamburger, Directed by Seth Bockley, Movement by Devon DeMayo & Patrick McCollum, Music by Kyle Miller & Towr’s, Kyle Henderson & Desert, Noises and Gregory Alan Isakov, Video by Michael Tutaj, Sound by Mikhail Fiksel, Lighting by Scott Bolman.

2018: Red Hills (101 Greenwich Street), Written by Asiimwe Deborah Kawe and Sean Christopher Lewis, directed by Katie Pearl; with actors Christopher McLinden and Patrick J. Ssenjovu; composition and live music by Farai Malianga and singer Sifiso Mabena; set design by Adam Rigg; lighting design by Brian Aldous & Adam Macks; costume design by Angela M. Fludd; and dramaturgy by Morgan Jenness.

2020: Fandango for Butterflies (And Coyotes) (La MaMa Experimental Theatre Club), Written by Andrea Thome, directed by José Zayas, original music by Sinuhé Padilla; with actors Carlo Albán, Jen Anaya, Silvia Dionicio, Sinuhé Padilla, Andrés Quintero, Frances Ines Rodriguez, Roberto Tolentino, and Tania Mesa; scenic and projection design by Johnny Moreno; lighting design by Lucrecia Briceno; sound design by Marcelo Añez; costume design by Fabian Fidel Aguilar; and choreography by Alexandra Beller.

Awards

Obie Awards (6): Bad Penny (Best New American Play: Mac Wellman) 1990; Bad Penny (Best Direction: Jim Simpson 1990; Crowbar (Performance: Elzbieta Czyzewska) 1990; En Garde Arts (Obie Grant) 1991; Orestes (Performance: Jefferson Mays) 1994; The Trojan Women (Performance: Sharon Scruggs) 1997

Drama Desk Awards (2): The Waste Land (Outstanding One Person Show, Unique Theatrical Experience) 1997

Outer Critics Circle Awards (1): Crowbar (Special Award) 1989-90

Edwin Booth Award, 1995

Staff Information

Anne Hamburger (Founding Artistic Director) founded En Garde Arts in 1985. As its Artistic Director and Creative Producer, she is responsible for pioneering site-specific theatre in New York in the 80s and 90s, using its streets and historic landmarks as her stage.   Hamburger produced the work of artists that are now internationally renowned: Anne Bogart, Charles L. Mee, Tina Landau, Jonathan Larson and Reza Abdoh, with large scale predominantly outdoor work. In 1999 she went on to launch and run Creative Entertainment, a global division for Disney where she brought the finest theatre artists into the parks for the first time in their history.  She then returned to NYC and re-launched En Garde Arts in 2014.  In its second incarnation, En Garde is developing theatre that has social change at its core, assembling some of the finest most visionary artists working in the theatre today.  En Garde’s producing structure is highly collaborative, encouraging artists to explore storytelling through music, movement, multimedia and site-specificity. 

For her work, she has won 6 Obies, 2 Drama Desk Awards, an Outer Critics Circle Award, Lee Reynolds Award and the Exceptional Merit in Media Award from The National Political Women’s Caucus.

Anne is a member of the League of Professional Theatre Women and is the recipient of an Exceptional Merit in Media Award from the National Political Women’s Caucus. She graduated with a Master of Fine Arts degree from the Yale School of Drama.

Heather Cohn (Executive Director) assumed the role of Executive Director of En Garde Arts after serving as the Director of Development & Community Engagement. Her work with En Garde includes extensive fundraising, community engagement, board relations and artistic and fiscal planning. Heather was the Director of Development for Epic Theatre Ensemble for 4.5 years and prior to that worked with New York Theatre Workshop, The Pearl Theatre Company, and Theatre Communications Group.

Heather is also a co-founder and the Producing Director of Flux Theatre Ensemble, an off-off-Broadway company founded in 2006. With Flux, Heather has produced 27 full productions, including 16 world premieres. She is the director of nine Flux productions, with playwrights including Gus Schulenburg, Erin Browne, Kristen Palmer, Kevin R. Free, and Johnna Adams. She served as Assistant Director to Austin Pendleton on Johnna Adams’s Gidion’s Knot. She has also directed with companies including Rattlestick, Lark Play Development Center, Cherry Lane, the EstroGenius Festival, and Planet Connections.

She is a board member of the League of Professional Theatre Women (LPTW) and serves as co-chair on the Task Force for trans inclusion. She was a member of the Producers’ LAB with WP Theatre and is a graduate of Vassar College where she majored in Latin American Studies and spent time living in Cuba and Chile.

References

En Garde Arts 2014 to present

Official Website 
New York Times Review on Wilderness 
New York Times Feature on Wilderness 
Georgetowner Review on Wilderness 
Village Voice Review on Wilderness 
MD Theatre Guide Review on Wilderness 
Theater Pizzazz Review on Wilderness 
Metro Weekly Feature on Wilderness 
Washington Post Feature on Wilderness 
NBC Feature on Wilderness 

New York Times Review on Basetrack Live 
New York Times Feature on Basetrack Live 
New York Times Feature on Basetrack Live 
The Daily Texan Review on Basetrack Live 
Daily Bruin Review on Basetrack Live 
Theater Mania Review on Basetrack Live 
Broadway World Feature on Basetrack Live 
BAM Feature on Basetrack Live 
American Theatre Feature on Basetrack Live 

En Garde Arts 1985 to 1999

Information from The New York Times online archives and the En Garde Arts archives.

External links 
 
 En Garde Arts records, 1980-1999, held by the Billy Rose Theatre Division, New York Public Library for the Performing Arts

Arts organizations based in New York City
Theatre companies in New York City
Arts organizations established in 1985
1985 establishments in New York City
Theatre company production histories